Caryocar amygdaliferum is a plant native to the rain forests of the Choco region of Colombia and Panama. Its fruit consists of a spiny husk inside which a seed about three times the size of an almond develops. It has been used for similar purpose as the almond and was traded as a luxury item among the Inca in pre-conquest times and grown in the land of the Chachapoyas. It is also eaten by some species of bats.

References

Coe, Sophie D. (1994) America's first cuisines 

amygdaliferum
Flora of South America